Barry John McCarthy (born 13 September 1992) is an Irish cricketer. He made his first-class debut in 2015, and plays for the Ireland cricket team, and previously the English side Durham. Primarily a right-arm medium pace bowler, he also bats right handed.  His sister, Louise McCarthy is an international cricketer for Ireland Women. In January 2020, he was one of nineteen players to be awarded a central contract from Cricket Ireland, the first year in which all contracts were awarded on a full-time basis.

Career
He made his Twenty20 debut on 20 May 2016 for Durham against Worcestershire Rapids in the 2016 NatWest t20 Blast.

In June 2016 he was named in Ireland's squad for their One Day International (ODI) series against Sri Lanka, having previously represented Ireland U19s in five matches. He made his ODI debut for Ireland on 16 June 2016. He made his Twenty20 International (T20I) debut for Ireland against Afghanistan on 10 March 2017 and took 4 wickets. However, his performance in only his 2nd T20I with bowling figures were the most expensive bowling figures in a T20I.

Following the conclusion of the 2018 Cricket World Cup Qualifier tournament, the International Cricket Council (ICC) named McCarthy as the rising star of Ireland's squad. In November 2018, McCarthy left Durham to focus on his international career with Ireland. In December 2018, he was one of nineteen players to be awarded a central contract by Cricket Ireland for the 2019 season.

In January 2019, he was named in Ireland's squad for their one-off Test against Afghanistan in India, but he did not play. In May 2019, in the opening match of the 2019 Ireland Tri-Nation Series against the West Indies, McCarthy took his 50th wicket in ODI cricket.

In October 2019, he was added to Ireland's squad ahead of the playoff matches in the 2019 ICC T20 World Cup Qualifier tournament in the United Arab Emirates, replacing David Delany, who was ruled out due to an injury. On 10 July 2020, McCarthy was named in Ireland's 21-man squad to travel to England to start training behind closed doors for the ODI series against the England cricket team. In September 2021, McCarthy was named in Ireland's provisional squad for the 2021 ICC Men's T20 World Cup. McCarthy was named in Ireland's Test squad for their tours of Bangladesh in March 2023 and Sri Lanka in April 2023. He was also named in the T20I and ODI squads for the Bangladesh tour.

References

External links
 
 

1992 births
Living people
Irish cricketers
Ireland One Day International cricketers
Ireland Twenty20 International cricketers
Cricketers from County Dublin
Durham cricketers
Leinster Lightning cricketers